Asylum of the Damned, Columbia Tristar (2004), also known as Hellborn, CDA Entertainment, is a 2003 horror film written by Matt McCombs, directed by Philip J Jones and starring Matt Stasi and Bruce Payne.

Plot
A young psychology student, named James Bishop (Matt Stasi), is recruited by St. Andrews Mental Hospital. He is given the opportunity to care for mentally ill patients under the tutelage of Dr McCort (Bruce Payne). James' enthusiasm for his new job soon develops into concern when some of the patients die mysteriously. When James seeks to learn more about the deaths, he notes a change in the behaviour of his colleagues. James comes to realise that a Devil has taken over the minds of the patients and that his colleagues are allowing it to harvest them.

Cast
 Bruce Payne as Dr McCort
 Matt Stasi as James Bishop
 Tracy Scoggins as Helen
 Julia Lee as Lauren
 Tom Lister, Jr. as Smithy (Listed as Tom 'Tiny' Lister)
 Gregory Wagrowski as Hadley
 Bill McKinney as Gas Station Attendant
 Randall England as Harry Smith
 Kyle T. Heffner as Dr. Peter Francis

Reception

A reviewer in Fangoria stated that 'at the three-quarters mark it becomes clear that this is the old Karloff-Lugosi The Black Cat dished up anew with Payne and the nuthouse staff substituting for Boris and his cultists and a Demon added'. The reviewer stated that the filmmakers did a good job of setting the eerie stage' and that the 'movie succeeded nicely in grabbing and holding the interest'. The reviewer also stated that Bruce Payne's Dr McCort seemed 'based on some old Vincent Price performance'. Scott C. stated that he enjoyed 'Payne’s take on Dr McCort, as a charming man who enjoys being evil, but the rest of the cast is on autopilot or thorazine'. Francis Barbier described the film as a 'cinematic waste, without any trace of intelligence or originality' and 'transcendently moronic'. Ian Jane lamented that 'the film very quickly falls prey to some seriously predictable and overly cliché characters and plot points that ultimately result in a film that isn't so much scary as it is just plain boring'.

References

External links

2003 films
2003 horror films
2000s English-language films
American supernatural horror films
The Devil in film
2000s American films